Virág Vaszari (born 22 March 1986 in Dombóvár) is a retired Hungarian team handball player.

Achievements
Nemzeti Bajnokság I:
Bronze Medalist: 2010
Magyar Kupa
Finalist: 2006
EHF Cup
Winner: 2005

References

External links
 Career statistics at Worldhandball

1986 births
Living people
People from Dombóvár
Hungarian female handball players
Fehérvár KC players
Sportspeople from Tolna County